This is a list of books from the Fear Street book series created and written by R. L. Stine. The first book, The New Girl was published in 1989. Various spin-off series were written, including the Fear Street Sagas and Ghosts of Fear Street. More than 80 million Fear Street books have been sold as of 2003. The books appeared in many bestseller lists, including the New York Times Best Seller list for children, USA Today bestseller list and Publishers Weekly bestseller list, and the series was listed as the bestselling young-adult book series of all time.

Original Fear Street series

New Fear Street

A Fear Street Novel 
Six new Fear Street books were published from September 2014. "Give Me a K-I-L-L" was the last contracted novel, but R.L. Stine confirmed via Twitter that more Fear Street books were planned.

Return To Fear Street 
Harper Collins' HarperTEEN picked up the Fear Street series in 2018 with "Return to Fear Street." The first novel in this series, "You May Now Kill The Bride" was released on July 24, 2018. This new series is released in paperback and also brings a return to the retro "pulp" style book covers.

Fear Street Super Chiller

Fear Street Cheerleaders

The Fear Street Saga

99 Fear Street: The House of Evil

Fear Street: The Cataluna Chronicles

Fear Street: Fear Park

Ghosts of Fear Street
Ghosts of Fear Street is a younger version of the Fear Street series, aimed at children ages 8 to 12. In every book, a 12-year-old child (sometimes with their friends or family) has a terrifying adventure in Fear Street, a small street in the town of Shadyside which is known by the kids in the books to have many ghosts and monsters. Every book has a different monster and child. The series was released by the Simon & Schuster imprint Aladdin Paperbacks, and lasted for thirty-six books, released from 1996 to 1998. In August 2009, Simon & Schuster, under their Children's Publishing imprint, began to reissue the books in special two-in-one editions. Despite being published under Stine's name, the books were in fact ghostwritten.

Fear Street Sagas
The 16 books in this series were published by Simon Pulse and Golden Books from March 1996 to January 1999. Two other books, The Raven Woman and Carousel of Fear appeared on advertisements, but were never released. R. L. Stine confirmed via his official Twitter account that neither of these unpublished books were ever written.

Fear Street Seniors

Fear Street Nights

Notes

References

Bibliography
 Collins, Robert A.; Latham, Robert. Science Fiction & Fantasy Book Review Annual 1991. Greenwood Publishing Group: 1993. 
 Gerasimo, Luisa; Whiteley, Sandra. The Teacher's Calendar of Famous Birthdays. McGraw-Hill: 2003.

External links

 R. L. Stine's official site
 Fear Street Sagas on Librarything.com
 Fear Street Sagas on Taylor.lib.oh.us

Novel sequences
Books
Lists of books